Die Heuwels Fantasties is the first album from South African electronic rock group Die Heuwels Fantasties. It was released in 2009 by Supra Familias in South Africa.

Track listing

References

Die Heuwels Fantasties albums
2009 albums